Superettan is the second-tier league of men's professional basketball in Sweden. The league was established in 2017 and replaced the Basketettan as the second level. Köping Stars was the inaugural champion. The winners of Superettan are promoted to Basketligan. As of the 2021-22 season there will be a playoffs after the end of the regular season. For the seasons prior, the winner of the regular season was crowned superettan champion.

Current teams
The proposed clubs for the 2021–22 season are:

Playoff format 
The quarterfinals and semifinals are determined in two games, one home and one away, with the top seeded team starting away. The finals is played in a best-of-three series, alternating between home and away games, with the top seeded team starting at home.

Champions

References

External links
Official website

Basketball leagues in Sweden
Sweden
Professional sports leagues in Sweden